= Nongcun Guangbo =

Radio station in Heilongjiang, China

Nongcun Guangbo is a radio station in Heilongjiang province of the People's Republic of China, broadcasting at 1020 AM.
